Jarra Central is one of the six districts of the Lower River Division of the Gambia. In the 2013, it had a population of 8,437.

References 

Lower River Division
Districts of the Gambia